The Seaca is a right tributary of the river Moldova in Romania. It flows into the Moldova near Giulești.

References

Rivers of Romania
Rivers of Suceava County